Cartoon Pizza is an American animation studio located in Nashville, Tennessee. It was co-founded by Jim Jinkins and David Campbell as the successor to Jinkins' former company, Jumbo Pictures. A hallmark of both Jumbo Pictures and Cartoon Pizza has been their commitment to the continued use of hand-painted cel animation at a time when animated series are increasingly produced using digital ink and paint. 

The studio had partnered with several studios to help produce their shows, including Disney in 2001, Sesame Workshop in 2006, and Cuppa Coffee Studios. The studio was formerly headquartered in New York City until 2011, when the company relocated to Nashville, Tennessee.

History
In February 1996, the company was bought by The Walt Disney Company, which produced Doug's 1st Movie (1999) and integrated the studio into its subsidiary Walt Disney Television Animation.

In 2001, a year after Jim Jinkins' former company Jumbo Pictures was closed by The Walt Disney Company, Jinkins and David Campbell formed Cartoon Pizza as a successor company. Jinkins was helming the position as president, Campbell as CEO, Jack Spillum as the president of animated productions, Ellie Copeland as the vice president of finances and operations, and Beldeen Fortunato as the vice president of administration.

In December 2001, Cartoon Pizza agreed to a two-year nonexclusive production deal with Sesame Workshop, the creators of Sesame Street, Dragon Tales, and Sagwa, the Chinese Siamese Cat. Sesame Workshop agreed to house the company at their New York City office and handle international distribution. They would co-produce a minimum of six new kids' properties.

The company became a co-production partner in Tiger Aspect Productions' animation division to develop a series titled Earth Kid. Gullane Entertainment became an equal partner in Earth Kid as the show's international distributor in April 2002 until it was acquired by HIT Entertainment in September of that year. Gullane and HIT also had three other projects in the works with Cartoon Pizza.

In 2015, the company had been dissolved. As of December 2016, Cartoon Pizza was brought back by Jim Jinkins, but in Nashville, Tennessee.

Productions

References

External links
Cartoon Pizza's website via the Wayback Machine

American animation studios
Companies based in Nashville, Tennessee
Television production companies of the United States
Re-established companies
Mass media companies established in 2001
Mass media companies disestablished in 2015
2001 establishments in New York (state)
2015 disestablishments in Tennessee
Mass media companies established in 2016
2016 establishments in Tennessee